Patar may refer to:

People
Surjit Patar (born 1945), a Punjabi poet
Vincent Patar (born 1965), a Belgian filmmaker
Maitrayee Patar (born 1990), an Indian writer, poet and musical artist
Gopal Krishna Patar, an Indian politician from Jharkhand

Places
Patar, Iran, a village in Sistan and Baluchestan Province
Fetr, a village in Qazvin Province, Iran, also known as Patar
Patar, Senegal, a commune of Senegal
Patar, Tajikistan
An old name for the town of Paat in Sindh, Pakistan

See also